Pomella may refer to:
 a trademark of pomegranate ellagitannins
 Pomella (gastropod), a freshwater snail genus in the family Ampullariidae